Glen Mortimer is an Australian former professional rugby league footballer who played for Cronulla-Sutherland. He is also the brother to Chris Mortimer, Peter Mortimer and Steve Mortimer.  The brothers were all raised in the Riverina city of Wagga Wagga, New South Wales.

He started in the lower grades at Canterbury-Bankstown before moving to Cronulla-Sutherland.

References

See also
 Mortimer family
 Glen Mortimer at RLP

Living people
Australian rugby league players
Cronulla-Sutherland Sharks players
Glen
Rugby league centres
Rugby league five-eighths
Rugby league players from Wagga Wagga
Rugby league second-rows
Year of birth missing (living people)